Barry Leigh Beisner (born June 5, 1951) is a retired American bishop. He was the seventh bishop of the Episcopal Diocese of Northern California.

Following studies at the Church Divinity School of the Pacific (M.Div.) and the General Theological Seminary (S.T.M.), Beisner was ordained to the diaconate on June 24, 1978, and to the priesthood on May 19, 1979. He was consecrated on September 30, 2006. He announced his retirement at the diocesan convention of the Episcopal Diocese of Northern California on in November 2017. He was succeeded by the Rt. Rev. Megan M. Traquair upon her consecration on June 29, 2019.

See also
 List of Episcopal bishops of the United States
 Historical list of the Episcopal bishops of the United States

References

External links 
 Diocesan website

Living people
1951 births
General Theological Seminary alumni
Episcopal bishops of Northern California